Shanghai Diesel Engine Co., Ltd. (SDEC) is a Chinese diesel engine manufacturing company which is wholly owned by SAIC Motor. SDEC headquarters and main production facilities are located in Yangpu District, in Shanghai. It was founded as Wusong Works organization in 1947 and renamed as the Shanghai Diesel Engine Factory in 1953. SDEC was restructured into a stock-shared company in 1993.

In 1994, SDEC was the first company in China to receive ISO9001 certification. SDEC has also been awarded QS9000 and TS16949 certification conducted by TÜV Rheinland. In 2002 and 2005, SDEC was awarded with the Golden Award of Quality for the 6CT natural gas engine as it was evaluated as the best engine by the World Passenger Car Association. In 2006, SDEC was awarded "Best Engine Manufacturer" by the World Passenger Car Association.

Products

Diesel engines

C Series
C series engine are based on the 3306-series diesel engine from Caterpillar Inc. In 2006, SDEC carried out a upgrades in cooperation with FEV.
SC11C
SC11CB184
SC11CB195
SC11CB200
SC11CB200.1 
SC11CB220
SC11CB220.1
SC11CB220.2
SC11CB240
SC11CB240.1
SC11CB270

D Series
The D series engine was jointly designed by SDEC and AVL (Austria) based on domestic fuel quality and user habits. In 2005, SDEC carried out a redesign and 4-valve upgrade in cooperation with Southwest Research Institute (SwRI) of USA.
SC8D
SC9D
D683

E Series 
The E series engine was jointly designed by SDEC and AVL (Austria)
SC10E
SC12E

G Series
G series marine engine are based on the 3128 Xinlong diesel engine jointly designed by SDEC and AVL.
G128
SC13G
SC15G

H Series
Engines jointly designed and developed by SDEC and UK Ricardo plc.
SC4H
SC7H

M Series 
Light-duty truck engines jointly developed with GM.
 SC20M

SC20M (D20)
Also called SAIC "π" engine (twin-turbo), VGT 2.0L diesel engine that will be used in all new SAIC Maxus vehicles.

R Series 

Engines based on a VM Motori license.
SC25R
SC28R

W Series
Marine engine with 4 valves per cylinder, mechanical governor and P11 high-pressure fuel injection.
SC33W

Diesel generator sets 
All sets come equipped with an auto-starting device and an optional ATS switch cabinet.

D series
Powered by D series diesel engines.
SD-SC200
SD-SC250

E series
Powered by E series diesel engines.
SD-SC325

G series
Powered by G series diesel engines.
SD-SC313
SD-SC375
SD-SC450
SD-SC500
SD-SC563
SD-SC625
SD-SC682

H series
Powered by H series diesel engines.
SD-SC63
SD-SC80
SD-SC100
SD-SC125
SD-SC150
SD-SC188

SR series
Powered by SR series diesel engines
D500MG
D540MG
D600MG
D800MG
D1000MG
D1100MG
D1200MG
D1360MG
D1500MG
D1600MG

W series
Powered by W series diesel engines.
SD-SC750

References

External links 
SDEC official site
SDEC USA

Engine manufacturers of China
Marine engine manufacturers
Diesel engine manufacturers
SAIC Motor
Chinese brands
Manufacturing companies based in Shanghai
Chinese companies established in 1947